KPD 1930+2752 is a binary star system including a subdwarf B star and a probable white dwarf with relatively high mass. Due to the nature of this astronomical system, it seems like a likely candidate for a potential type Ia supernova, a type of supernova which occurs when a white dwarf star takes on enough matter to approach the Chandrasekhar limit, the point at which electron degeneracy pressure would not be enough to support its mass.  However, carbon fusion would occur before this limit was reached, releasing enough energy to overcome the force of gravity holding the star together and resulting in a supernova.

The total mass of the binary star system slightly exceeds the Chandrasekhar limit, making this system a candidate as a progenitor for a future type Ia supernova, although future mass loss is likely to reduce system mass below threshold.

See also
IK Pegasi, the nearest supernova progenitor candidate

References

Cygnus (constellation)
Binary stars
Cygni, V2214
White dwarfs
B-type subdwarfs
J19321480+2758354